Abhay Sharma (born 30 April 1969) is an Indian former first-class cricketer who played for Delhi, Railways and Rajasthan. As of January 2016, he works as the fielding coach of India A and India Under-19s. In 2021, he was named as the fielding coach of Indian women's national cricket team.

Playing career 
Sharma played as a right-handed wicket-keeper batsman, representing teams such as Delhi, Railways, Rajasthan, Central Zone, India under-19s and the Board President's XI. In a career that spanned 1987/88 to 2003/04, he appeared in 89 first-class and 40 List A matches. He was part of the Delhi team that won the 1988–89 Ranji Trophy. He finished his career with Railways, scoring more than 4000 runs at an average of 35.38 and making 179 dismissals in first-class matches.

Coaching career 

Sharma was the Railways cricket team coach for seven years starting from 2007. Having completed coaching courses in batting, fielding and wicket-keeping in England, he was assigned to coach in the National Cricket Academy as well as India B in the Challenger Trophy. In 2013, he became the fielding and wicket-keeping coach of India A. He was appointed as the head coach of Himachal Pradesh in 2014 ahead of the 2014–15 Ranji Trophy. He became the fielding coach of India Under-19s in 2015.

He had picked a 19-year-old Karn Sharma in the Railways squad for 2007–08 Ranji Trophy. After Karn scored a century on his first-class debut that season, Abhay trained him on his leg spin bowling and has been his coach since then.

He was named fielding of coach of India national cricket team for Zimbabwe tour in June 2016. He worked under interim head coach Sanjay Bangar.

References

External links 
 
 

1969 births
Living people
Indian cricketers
Delhi cricketers
Railways cricketers
Rajasthan cricketers
Central Zone cricketers
Indian cricket coaches
Wicket-keepers